Hinds County Courthouse may refer to:

Hinds County Courthouse (Jackson, Mississippi), listed on the NRHP in Hinds County, Mississippi
Hinds County Courthouse (Raymond, Mississippi), also listed on the NRHP in Hinds County, Mississippi